Georgia State Route 160 may refer to:

 Georgia State Route 160 (1940–1941): A former state highway that existed in Treutlen County
 Georgia State Route 160 (1946–1995): A former state highway that existed in Clayton and DeKalb counties

160